Sadanand Dhume is an American writer and journalist based in Washington D.C. He is the author of My Friend the Fanatic: Travels with a Radical Islamist, a travel narrative about the rise of fundamentalism in Indonesia, the world's most populous Muslim country.

In 2007 Dhume was an inaugural Bernard Schwartz Fellow at the Asia Society.

Dhume is a self-identified atheist.

Publications 
My Friend the Fanatic (New York: Skyhorse Publishing, 2009).
"India Needs Harvard as Well as Hard Work" The Wall Street Journal, October 17, 2019.
"Pakistan, Stop Coddling Terrorists" The Wall Street Journal, November 29, 2018.
"India Should Quit Harassing the ‘Super-Rich’,"  The Wall Street Journal, August 22, 2019.
"Hindu Supremacism Turns Deadly in Delhi," Wall Street Journal, March 5, 2020.
"The Dueling Narratives of India’s Kashmir Crackdown," The Atlantic, September 5, 2019.
"Is India an Ally?" Commentary, January 2008.
"Sir Salman Rushdie," The Wall Street Journal, June 23, 2007.
"Playboy in Indonesia," The Wall Street Journal, March 29, 2007.

References

American male journalists
Columbia University Graduate School of Journalism alumni
Living people
Indian atheists
The Wall Street Journal people
Princeton School of Public and International Affairs alumni
Year of birth missing (living people)